El Rapto de las Sabinas (English Translation: The Rape of the Sabine Women) is a 1962 historical drama film adaptation of the Roman foundation myth about the abduction of Sabine women by the Romans shortly after the foundation of the city of Rome (probably in the 750s BC).

The film was written and directed by Alberto Gout.

Cast
Lorena Velázquez as "Hersilia"
Tere Velázquez as "Rhea Silvia"
Wolf Ruvinskis as "Romulus"
Luis Induni as "Titus Tacius"
Victor Ruiz as "Remus"

See also
List of historical drama films
List of films set in ancient Rome

External links
 

1962 films
1960s historical films
Peplum films
Mexican historical drama films
Films based on classical mythology
Films set in ancient Rome
Films set in the 8th century BC
Sword and sandal films
Cultural depictions of Romulus and Remus
Films directed by Alberto Gout
1960s Italian films